The Walgren Lake Monster (also known as the Alkali Lake Monster and Giganticus Brutervious) is a cryptid of varying description reported in Walgren Lake near Hay Springs, Nebraska.

Description 
Different accounts offer wide-ranging descriptions of the creature. One of the earliest and most famous accounts by a local man named J.A. Johnson described an animal that was dull grey or brown and similar to an alligator, but much larger and heavier with a horn between its eyes and nostrils. Johnson and two others claimed to see the monster from twenty yards away and the men estimated the creature to be about forty feet long. Other reported sightings claim that the creature was similar to a very large catfish or mudpuppy. The Nebraska State Historical Society reports that contemporary accounts believed Johnson actually saw an unusually large beaver.

Legend and legacy 
The original legend of the Walgren Lake Monster claimed to be corroborated by Native American accounts of a similar beast inhabiting the lake. The initial story of a lake monster which devoured livestock sparked curiosity throughout Nebraska and abroad, even reaching the London Times. According to some articles published at the time, unsuccessful efforts were made to capture the monster.

In her 1935 biography Old Jules, Mari Sandoz mentioned the monster and its notoriety. Sandoz claimed local fundamentalist Christians believed that the monster was created by Satan to test the faith of locals: "The same devil that scattered the fossil bones over the earth to confound those of little faith could plant a sea monster among the sinners".

As time went on, the legend of the monster evolved to include the supposed supernatural abilities of the creature. The July 1938 issue of the Federal Writers Project in Nebraska's Tall Tales monthly publication offered a description of the monster's massive size, which reportedly caused the earth to tremble whenever he moved such that "the farmers become seasick for miles around". The article went on to claim that the monster came ashore daily to eat large numbers of livestock and in doing so created a thick, green mist which disoriented travelers in the area.

The January 1962 edition of Outdoor Nebraska repeated the story as recorded in the 1938 telling, specifically corroborating the disorienting fog. The 1962 article exaggerates the claims of the 1938 story further by claiming a group of "eastern innocents" had fallen victim to the creature's earth-shaking and had been bounced from Hay Springs to Valentine, over one hundred miles away.

The legend of the Walgren Lake Monster was likely created and distributed by John G. Maher, a Nebraska politician and newspaperman, as a sensational story to sell more newspapers. Maher is known for several other hoaxes perpetrated in Nebraska, such as burying a cement casting of a Buffalo Soldier in an archeological site near Chadron and proclaiming it a "petrified man", sinking bags of soda in a hot spring and reporting on the healing properties of the "soda springs", and warning that the British Navy was sailing up the Mississippi and Missouri rivers to punish Irish immigrants who supported the Irish Republic. Regardless of the probable hoax, the village of Hay Springs has embraced the monster as a local symbol, selling commemorative shirts and buttons as well as creating a replica of the monster based on Johnson's original description out of green flotation material.

See also 
 Sea monster
 List of cryptids
 Hoax
 Sandhills (Nebraska)

References 

American legendary creatures
Nebraska folklore
Water monsters